Huracanes de Tampico (English: Tampico Hurricanes) is a professional Mexican basketball team, based in Tampico, Tamaulipas. The Libertadores are part of the Liga Nacional de Baloncesto Profesional, the top professional basketball league in Mexico. The team plays their home games at the Expo Tampico, with a capacity of 4,200 spectators.

History
Professional basketball in Tampico started in the 90s, with the Correcaminos UAT Tampico, the team achieved 4 championships and were runners-up twice in the Conferencia de Básquetbol Profesional.

Huracanes was established in 2009 as a joint effort of public institutions and private entities to bring professional football back to the city of Tampico. Huracanes is also the first LNBP team to have played a friendly match against a European team, FC Barcelona Bàsquet.

After the 2014–15 season, the team went on hiatus, making their comeback for the 2018–19 season.

For the 2018–19 season, Argentine Marcelo Elusich was appointed as head coach.

Players

Current roster

References

External links 
 Official website 
 Team profile 

Basketball teams in Mexico
Basketball teams established in 2009
2009 establishments in Mexico
Sports teams in Tamaulipas
Tampico